The OM615 was a four-cylinder diesel engine made by Mercedes-Benz. A successor to the OM621, it was sold in early 1968 in two versions:  and  engine. 

Applications:
 1968–1973	Mercedes-Benz 200D, 
 1973–1976 Mercedes-Benz 200D, 
 1968–1973	Mercedes-Benz 220D, 
 1973–1976 Mercedes-Benz 220D, 
 1976–1979 Mercedes-Benz 200D, 
 1979–1985 Mercedes-Benz 200D, 
 1976–1981 Mercedes-Benz N1300
 1981–1986 Mercedes-Benz MB100/MB130

Variants
The OM615.940 was a  engine with an bore and stroke .

The OM615.941 was a  version with the same  bore but a longer  stroke.

See also
 List of Mercedes-Benz engines

References

OM615
Diesel engines by model
Straight-four engines